Lee Hsin (16 July 1953 – 28 September 2017) was a Taiwanese politician who served on the Taipei City Council from 1998 to his death in 2017. He could speak fluent Mandarin Chinese and Hokkien.

Political career
In 1993, he followed Yok Mu-ming from the Kuomintang to the New Party. In 1996, Lee was elected to the National Assembly. Lee joined the 2006 campaign led by Shih Ming-teh which attempted to force the resignation of President Chen Shui-bian. In 2008, he rejoined to the Kuomintang.

In 2015, Lee expressed interest in running for the Kuomintang chairmanship, but his candidacy, and that of four others, was rejected.

2016 KMT chairmanship election
The next year, he launched another bid for the party leadership, finishing third in a field of four candidates with 7,604 votes.

He was a member of both the New Party and People First Party, and later joined the Kuomintang.

Personal life

Death 
On 28 September 2017, Lee died from jumping out of his apartment building in Daan District, Taipei City, Taiwan. He was 64.

References

1953 births
2017 deaths
Kuomintang politicians in Taiwan
Taipei City Councilors
National Chung Hsing University alumni
National Taiwan University alumni
National Chengchi University alumni
People First Party (Taiwan) politicians
New Party (Taiwan) politicians
Taiwanese politicians who committed suicide
Suicides by jumping in Taiwan